Altamont is a town in Duchesne County, Utah, United States. The population was 225 at the 2010 census, an increase over the 2000 figure of 178.

History
The town was settled in the 1930s as a central location for a new area high school. The school was finished in 1935 and named Altamont, combining the names of the area villages of Altonah and Mt. Emmons. The community grew gradually and petitioned to incorporate as a town in 1953. In 2012 the newest addition to the school was finished.

Geography
According to the United States Census Bureau, the town has a total area of 0.2 square mile (0.4 km), all land.

Climate
Altamont has a cold semi-arid climate (Köppen BSk) with cold winters and warm summers.

Demographics

As of the census of 2010, there were 225 people in 83 households in the town. The racial makeup of the town was 96% White, 2% Native American, and 1.3% from Hispanic or Latino.

The population was 46 percent male and 54 percent female. The population was 31.6 percent under 18 and 12.9 percent 65 or over.

Education
The town is home to Altamont High School. The school mascot is Louie the Longhorn. Altamont competes as a 1A school and has local rivalries with Duchesne and Tabiona.

See also

 List of municipalities in Utah

References

External links

Towns in Duchesne County, Utah
Towns in Utah